Ballantine may refer to:

Ballantine Inc., a manufacturer of underground construction equipment
Ballantine Books, an American publishing company
Ballantine Brewery, an American brewery, producer of Ballantine Ale
Ballantine's, a range of Scotch whiskies
Ballantine scale, a standard for measuring shoreline exposure

People
Ballantine (surname)

Places
Ballantine, Montana, a US census-designated place
John Ballantine House, a historic home and museum in New Jersey

See also
Balanchine
Ballentine (disambiguation)
Ballantyne
Bellenden
Ballenden
Ballandean, Queensland
Balindean, the spelling used by the Ogilvy-Wedderburn baronets